North Melbourne was an electoral district of the Legislative Assembly in the Australian state of Victoria from 1859 to 1927.

The Electoral District of North Melbourne was defined as being bound by Victoria Street/Parade on the south, Nicholson Street on the east, the southern boundary of portion 90, parish of Jika Jika on the north and a line south from Mains Bridge (now Flemington Bridge) to the Victoria Street alignment by the 1858 Electoral Districts Act. This included the suburbs of Carlton, Parkville and North Melbourne.

The district was abolished, along with several others, when the Electoral Districts Act 1926 was implemented in 1927.

Members
Two members initially, one from the redistribution of 1889 when Port Melbourne and other districts were created.

 = by-election
 = expelled

Prendergast went on to represent the Electoral district of Footscray, which was re-created in 1927.

Election results

References

Former electoral districts of Victoria (Australia)
1859 establishments in Australia
1927 disestablishments in Australia